Mount Gamkonora is a stratovolcano on Halmahera island, Indonesia. It has produced an elongated series of craters along the north–south rift. 

Mount Gamkonora is an active volcano that produced 13 eruptions with indices from 1 to 5 on the Volcanic Explosivity Index (VEI). The largest eruption occurred on 20 May 1673 (VEI-5) and was accompanied by a tsunami which inundated the nearby villages. Between 1564 and 1989 the volcano erupted twelve times.

The volcano erupted again on 10 July 2007, with over 8,000 people reported to have fled their homes in the vicinity.

See also

 List of volcanoes in Indonesia
 List of Ultras of Malay Archipelago

References

Stratovolcanoes of Indonesia
Active volcanoes of Indonesia
Mountains of Indonesia
Volcanoes of Halmahera
VEI-5 volcanoes
Holocene stratovolcanoes